David "Dave" Hartley (birth unknown – 16 January 2014), was an English professional rugby league footballer who played in the 1960s and 1970s.

Background
David Hartley's funeral service took place at Pontefract Crematorium, Wakefield Road, Pontefract at 3.20pm on Monday 27 January 2014.

Playing career

County honours
David Hartley won a cap for Yorkshire while at Featherstone Rovers; during the 1974–75 season against Cumbria

Challenge Cup Final appearances
David Hartley was an unused interchange/substitute in Featherstone Rovers' 17-12 victory over Barrow in the 1966–67 Challenge Cup Final during the 1966–67 season at Wembley Stadium, London on Saturday 13 May 1967, in front of a crowd of 76,290, played as an interchange/substitute, i.e. number 14, (replacing  Michael Smith) and scored a try, becoming the first interchange/substitute to score in the Challenge Cup Final, in the 33-14 victory over Bradford Northern in the 1972–73 Challenge Cup Final during the 1972–73 season at Wembley Stadium, London on Saturday 12 May 1973, in front of a crowd of 72,395, and played left-, i.e. number 4, in the 9-24 defeat by Warrington in the 1973–74 Challenge Cup Final during the 1973–74 season at Wembley Stadium, London on Saturday 11 May 1974, in front of a crowd of 77,400.

County Cup Final appearances
David Hartley played , i.e. number 5, (replaced by interchange/substitute Terry Hudson) in Featherstone Rovers' 9-12 defeat by Hull F.C. in the 1969–70 Yorkshire County Cup Final during the 1969–70 season at Headingley Rugby Stadium, Leeds on Saturday 20 September 1969, and played , and scored a try in the 7-23 defeat by Leeds in the 1970–71 Yorkshire County Cup Final during the 1970–71 season at Odsal Stadium, Bradford on Saturday 21 November 1970.

Club career
David Hartley made his début for Featherstone Rovers on Saturday 29 January 1966, and he played his last match for Featherstone Rovers during the 1975–76 season.

References

External links
Search for "Hartley" at rugbyleagueproject.org
Dave Hartley

1946 births
2014 deaths
English rugby league players
Featherstone Rovers players
Place of birth missing
Place of death missing
Rochdale Hornets players
Rugby league centres
Rugby league wingers
Yorkshire rugby league team players